Rear Admiral Vikram Menon, VSM is a serving flag officer of the Indian Navy. He currently serves as the Flag Officer Naval Aviation (FONA) and Flag Officer Goa Naval Area (FOGA). He previously served as the Assistant Chief of Naval Staff (Air) at Naval headquarters. He took over as FOGA/FONA on 30 April 2022 from Rear Admiral Philipose George Pynumootil.

Naval career 
Menon graduated from the National Defence Academy and was commissioned into the Indian Navy on 1 January 1990. He trained as a Naval aviator. He qualified as a fighter pilot on the British Aerospace Sea Harrier. He has over 2000 hours of flying experience and became a Qualified Flying Instructor (QFI). He was a senior pilot in INAS 300, the longest serving combat unit of the Indian Navy. He has flown the Sea Harrier extensively from the aircraft carrier 

Menon commanded the Trinkat-class patrol vessel  and the Sukanya-class patrol vessel . He also commanded the Naval Flight Test Squadron INAS 552. As a Captain, he commanded the Deepak-class fleet tanker . He was in command of INS Shakti during the International Fleet Review 2016 at Visakhapatnam. As part of the Eastern Fleet in 2015, INS Shakti, under his command, visited Thailand, Singapore, Indonesia, Cambodia and Australia as part of India's Act East policy.

He also served as the executive officer of the Rajput-class Guided-missile destroyer . He subsequently attended the Higher Naval Command course at the Naval War College, Goa. Menon then served as the Director of Aircraft Acquisition at Naval Headquarters.

Promoted to the rank of commodore, Menon took over as Commanding officer (CO) of the Naval air station INS Hansa in Goa. For his tenure as CO INS Hansa, he was awarded the Vishisht Seva Medal on 26 January 2018. He subsequently served as the Chief Staff Officer (Air) at Headquarters Naval Aviation to the then FONA Rear Admiral P. G. Pynumootil.

Flag rank
Menon was promoted to flag rank and appointed Assistant Chief of Naval Staff (Air) at Naval Headquarters. On 30 April 2022, he was appointed Flag Officer Naval Aviation (FONA). During this tenure, he also dual-hats as the Flag Officer Goa Area (FOGA).

Awards and decorations

References 

Indian Navy admirals
National Defence Academy (India) alumni
Living people
Year of birth missing (living people)
Indian naval aviators
Recipients of the Vishisht Seva Medal
Naval War College, Goa alumni